Mohamed Hashi Abdi Araby, also known as Mohamed Arabey, is a Somali politician.born 15th February 1972 He was the Vice President of Galmudug. He was elected on 4 July 2015, and served until February 2020 and now is Director General Ministry of Petroleum and mineral resources.
Mohamed is from the Marehan, a sub-clan of the Darod clan. he is from  Tayo party He helds from Abudwak (Somali: Caabudwaaq) is a town in the central Galgaduud province of Somalia.

References

Presidents of Galmudug
Vice presidents of Galmudug
Living people
Year of birth missing (living people)